Maquee is an album by Smile. It was released by Atlantic on July 18, 1995.

Background
Smile had originally finished recording the album by September 1994, and it was released under the San Diego-based label Headhunter. Their album caught the attention of Atlantic Records, and Smile was soon offered a contract. Upon signing with Atlantic, the trio quit their day jobs and began touring the country. Alongside some of the tour was the band "Inch", and Smile stayed on the road for nearly a year and a half promoting Maquee. Lyrically, the album plays with themes of fatalism, revenge, and Gothicism. The name of the album came from Reeder's best buddy from Barstow, who had the nickname "Maquee".

Rosas wrote their first single, which was one of the first songs he ever wrote, called "Staring at the Sun" in 1990, stating that he "...wasn't aware enough of what I was doing to be able to make any keen observations on the world of pop culture. It was just looking at my friends and me". It has been described as a "psychedelic plunge into retro rock and modern grunge" by Larry Flick of Billboard Magazine, and it is noted for having a particularly "loud" sound.

Reception

Maquee fared well with some reviewers, while some felt that it fell short of what they believed the band was capable of making. Ultimately, the album charted on College Music Journal's "Metal" chart in November 1995, but failed to appear afterwards.

The single "Staring at the Sun" received airplay on the radio.

Charts

Track listing

Personnel
 Scott Reederdrums, backing vocals on "Picture Made Past" and lead vocals on "Moosh"
 Mike Rosasvocals, guitar
 Aaron Sonnennbergbass guitar and backing vocals on "Wallflower"

Additional personnel
 Heather Andersonbacking vocals on "Until(?)"

References

Sources

1995 albums